Trachymyrmex nogalensis is a species of higher myrmicine in the family Formicidae.

References

Further reading

 
 
 
 
 
 
 
 

Myrmicinae
Insects described in 1951